The Beirut Central District (BCD) or Centre Ville is the historical and geographical core of Beirut, the capital of Lebanon. Also called downtown Beirut, it has been described the “vibrant financial, commercial, and administrative hub of the country.” It is thousands of years old, traditionally a focus of business, finance, culture and leisure.

The area is situated on the city's northern coast and is easily accessible from all parts of the city. This includes the adjacent Beirut Seaport and Rafik Hariri International Airport.

After the city center was destroyed by the Lebanese Civil War, it underwent thorough reconstruction and development, which restored its cultural and economic position in the region. A master plan for reconstructing the city was officially approved by the Lebanese Government in March 1994 after a series of detailed studies alongside public and professional seminars. On May 5, 1994, Solidere, The Lebanese company for the development and reconstruction of the Beirut Central District was formed, launching the largest urban redevelopment project of the 1990s. Ever since, Beirut Central District has evolved into an integrated business and commercial environment.

Today, Beirut Central District hosts the Lebanese Parliament, the Lebanese Government headquarters, the Beirut Stock Exchange, the regional offices of the United Nations, International Labour Organization, UNESCO, World Bank, as well as the headquarters of the ESCWA and the Union of Arab Banks.

Culture and heritage projects

Heritage Trail

The Heritage trail is a pedestrian circuit in the city's historic core and the traditional Beirut city center. The trail connects the main archaeological sites, places of historic interest, monuments and heritage buildings which are important to Beirut's rich past. The trail's path is marked by bronze medallions grouted into the sidewalk, with large general or district panels and smaller monument panels made from glazed lava stone tiles with texts in three languages (Arabic, French, English). The Heritage Trail is planned to start and end at the "City History Museum" on the ancient Tell Area. In an initial phase, pending the completion of the museum, the circuit will start at Beirut Souks, which retain the 2500-year-old ancient street grid and Ottoman access gates, and several other archaeological remains like the Phoenician-Persian quarter, Byzantine mosaics, old city wall and moat. The trail is divided into four major sections:
 First Route: The first route in the heritage trail covers the ancient archaeological "Tell Area". This site receives special treatment and much attention due to its significant historical importance, integrating several neighboring vestiges: preserved part of the Canaanite wall and gate, Phoenician glacis, Hellenistic remains, crusader castle foundations above earlier Roman fortifications, and remains of the Ottoman citadel. The future site museum will display remains from the Tell area and other archaeological sites which are part of the heritage trail. A sinuous underground path guides visitors through Canaanite, Phoenician-Persian, Hellinistic, Roman, Byzantine and Medieval ages.
 Second Route: This section of the Heritage Trail will straddle along several significant Beirut landmarks and buildings like the Town Hall, Parliament, Mohammad Al-Amin Mosque, Saint George Maronite Cathedral, Garden of Forgiveness ... etc. The route will also stroll along the arcaded streets of Maarad leading up to the Grand Theater historic building and numerous stone churches and Mamluk-era mosques.
 Third Route: This segment of the pedestrian circuit revolves largely around the "Roman Baths Garden" and the Grand Serail. The Roman Baths Garden at the base of the Serail Hill exhibits brick vaults, remains of ventilation networks, old water heating apparatuses, bathing areas among other archaeological remains from the bathhouse. The route also passes by terraced gardens, fountains, Olive and Pine groves, a small amphitheatre, leading all the way up to the hilltop where the route terminates at the Grand Serail, Hamidiyi Clock-tower, Council of Reconstruction and Development, and the St. Louis Capuchin crusader church.
 Fourth Route: The fourth route in the Heritage trail lies substantially within the Beirut Souks area. This route contains the Phoenician-Persian quarter, Roman-Byzantine findings, part of the Medieval moat and the Ottoman wharf. Some mosaics, remains, or arcades will be integrated into the new buildings. Other points of interest along the route are the "Zawiyat Ibin Iraq" shrine, Majidiyya Mosque, and the "Antoun Bey Caravanserai". Another section of the route displays a late Roman house with an internal garden paved with mosaics and an elaborate water and drainage system, Byzantine portico paved with mosaics and labeled shops, Phoenician storage jars, Mamluk potter kilns ... etc.

Shoreline Walk
The "Shoreline Walk" is a proposes sequence of connected spaces which form part of the reconstruction of the Beirut city centre. Following the 1975–91 Civil War in Lebanon, the Beirut city centre was left devastated, Avenue des Français and the coastline had become a dumping ground, extending the land by more than 600m to the north. The city was once known for its rocky shoreline Cornice, with its avenues of palms and cafés but during the war a rubbish mountain grew from daily waste tipped into the Mediterranean Sea. Areas have been both preserved and demolished by the new master plan, whilst the remediated landfill is set to become a new district, projecting out into the sea. Rather than leave the old coastline land-locked and redundant, it was decided to create a pedestrian route that straddled the old and new city boundaries. The ‘Shoreline Walk’ is placed between the natural topography and rationalised medieval street layout of the old city, and the engineered grid of the new land-filled area. Research revealed the evolution of Beirut's coastline. The first Phoenician settlers arrived in 1220 BC, followed by Romans in 64 BC, Mamluks in 1291 AD, Ottomans in 1516 and the French in 1918. Successive civilisations adjusted the coastline to create harbors that brought wealth to the city. Along the Shoreline Walk five squares provide areas to pause and relax: Harbour Square, All Saints Square, Shoreline Gardens, Zeytoune Square and Santiyeh Garden. Research into each space revealed remnants of the character of the pre-war city that had been forgotten or destroyed. Each "memory" generated the development of each square's atmosphere, aligned with the facilities and functions required by a contemporary city to create a network of complementary spaces.

Garden of Forgiveness

The Garden of Forgiveness is a project under development in the BCD. The garden is a socio-cultural project that commemorates the scars of the Lebanese Civil War, hence its location along the Green Line that once divided the city between warring factions. Members from more than six religious denominations have participated in the concept, plan, and development of the project. The garden's site is currently filled with uncovered ruins from over fifteen civilizations, most importantly the remains of the Roman city of Berytus. The square is surrounded by three mosques (Mohammad Al-Amin Mosque, Emir Assaf Mosque, Grand Omari Mosque) and three churches (Saint George Maronite Cathedral, St. Elie Greek Melkite Catholic Cathedral, St. Georges Greek Orthodox Cathedral). The award-winning design was conceived by Kathryn Gustafson, the acclaimed architect behind the Princess Diana Memorial Fountain in London. According to the designers, Lebanon's "will to become unified and prosperous" will be symbolized by selecting plants representing the regions of Lebanon, including Judas trees from the mountains, olive groves from the agricultural plains, and citrus trees from the coast. The archaeological heritage of the site will be respected by referencing the Cardo (main north–south road) and Decumanus (main east–west road), to create strong linear axes. Traces of the ancient pathway will also be highlighted in the design, along with a 4000-year-old heart-shaped well that is believed to had been related to the goddess Astarte. A proposal was also made to add a 9/11 memorial for all the Lebanese victims that went down in the attack.

St. Georges Cathedral Museum
It is a crypt museum at the St. Georges Greek Orthodox Cathedral on Nejme Square. It is a relatively small museum that reveals layers of Christian heritage belonging to a series of seven churches built on the same exact site starting 2000 years ago. The current cathedral stands on layers of relics where at every stage of its existence its people attempted to enlarge and beautify it, adding more murals and icons. The museum is a crypt underneath the cathedral where oil lamps, pipes, clay and terra cotta pots, miniature statues, and crosses found in various digs are displayed. Glass panels cover some of the crypt's relics and a glass partition separates the crypt from the church's altar directly above it. A narrow metal walkway leads visitors through the twelve stops of the crypt displaying tombstones, mosaics, burial chambers, engravings on stones and columns, well-preserved skeletons, a covered canal, and part of an ancient paved road. The ruins and findings were excavated by Lebanese archaeologists before the cathedral underwent restoration; they aimed at locating the Byzantine church Anastasis, which according to ancient texts is believed to be near Beirut's famous law school before it was leveled by the 551. earthquake.

Planet Discovery
Planet Discovery is the only permanent children's museum in Lebanon. It is located in Souk Ayyas in Beirut Souks. The museum was inaugurated in 1999 as a collaboration between Solidere, Parc de la Villette, and Palais de la Découverte. Relocated to Beirut Souks from Minet El-Hosn, the museum is home to a variety of exhibitions on science and technology offering hands-on-learning experiences for children of all ages. The museum focuses on a handful of themes like revisiting space up-close, exploring our body senses, learning about conception and reproduction, discovering physical phenomena ... etc. The Museum also has a day care center, theatre performances and puppet shows, arts and crafts workshops, and science labs. They also have a summer camp program in collaboration with "Gifted and Talented".

Robert Mouawad Private Museum
The Robert Mouawad Private Museum is a private residence in the Wadi Abu Jamil quarter that was turned into a museum by the Lebanese businessman Robert Mouawad. The palace was built by the Lebanese politician and art collector Henri Philippe Pharaoun in 1911 in Beirut. The museum houses a combination of art objects oriental and occidental cultures, and a rare collection of books, Chinese porcelain, ceramics, and other significant objects.

The palace's architecture and design reflects Pharaoun's infatuation with Islamic Art and decorative wooden panels that date back to the 19th century, especially after his repetitive travels to Syria. Other displayed artifacts include Byzantine mosaics, Roman marble sculptures, jars and jugs, historical columns, pottery, ancient weapons, unique carpets, sophisticated jewelry pieces, rare precious stones, Melkite Catholic icons, and preserved manuscripts.

Souk El Tayeb

Souk el Tayeb is an open-air weekly market held every Saturday at Trablos street in Beirut Souks (previously located in Saifi). The word souk is Arabic for market and tayeb means good in terms of taste and character. It began in its concept as an organic market, but soon changed to be a farmers’ market of fresh, local, and seasonal food products, that promotes small-scale farmers and producers.

The market offers green vegetables, tomatoes, fresh aromatic herbs, pulses, Pomegranate juice, Kibbeh, freshly squeezed carrot juice, a honey distiller, Makdous, Lebanese pastries, fruits, olives, Rose Water, homemade pickled vegetables, Labneh, Manakish made on the Saj, Markook bread ... etc. The market is organized and run by a non-profit cooperative organization headquartered on Rue Gouraud. The organization works on many levels nationally and internationally to promote and preserve Lebanese food and culinary traditions, rural heritage and natural environment. Souk el Tayeb has achieved over the years an economically viable and socially responsive approach to supporting small-scale farmers and producers, contributing to local community development initiatives, and educating about food traditions and heritage.

Conservatoire Libanais

Le Conservatoire libanais national supérieur de musique, or the Lebanese National Higher Conservatory of Music, was founded in the 1930s by Wadia Sabra, composer of the national anthem of Lebanon. In 1953, President Camille Chamoun along with the Minister of Education, ordered the creation of a board to manage the conservatory and the "Friends of Music" foundation was created to help finance the conservatory.

In 1959, the Conservatoire became 1959 an Autonomous National Institution under the supervision of the Minister of Education. During the Lebanese Civil War (1975-1991) the National Conservatoire suffered great damage: all the instruments, documents and the library were looted and burnt. The Conservatoire resumed teaching in 1991 and was upgraded in 1995 to a National Institution of Higher Education.

The conservatory is headed by the well-known composer and conductor Dr. Walid Gholmieh and has more than 4,800 students and 250 professors in more than 9 branches. The conservatory is home to the Lebanese National Symphony Orchestra, the Lebanese Philharmonic Orchestra (LPO) & the Lebanese Oriental Orchestra (LOO), that perform yearly more than 100 concerts and activities devoted to the conservatory's educational mission. Its main headquarters is on the Serail Hill in Downtown Beirut, directly facing the southern gate of the Grand Serail.

Beirut City History Museum
The Beirut City History Museum is a proposed project by Solidere on an archaeological site north of Martyrs Square. Excavations on the site in the mid-1990s unearthed such significant finds as the Phoenician Tell, the Bronze Age city gate and remains from the Persian, Hellenistic, Byzantine, Medieval and Ottoman periods. Shortly after Solidere commissioned french architect Michel Macary, known for his design of the Louvre extension, to undertake the initial study of the Tell and explore the concept of the site specific museum. The museum's design will be integrated with the Martyrs Square underground parking, the Petit Serail and the landscaped garden at the Martyrs Square and Tell site.

Solidere commissioned renowned Italian architect Renzo Piano to study the square's architectural and urban design, including the Beirut City History Museum, in cooperation with the Ministry of Culture. In order to safeguard the location while providing vehicle and pedestrian access in a heavy use environment, Solidere commissioned a study of three road options and a detailed design of the most appropriate one. The chosen option incorporates a two-way road and bridge structure on the east side of the Tell and underpasses to ensure pedestrian connection to the museum.

Civic institutions
After the reconstruction, the city center regained its role as the focus of civic life in Lebanon. Several key institutions have relocated there including the Parliament and its related offices, the Government's headquarters, and the Beirut Municipality. The BCD also has a dense concentration of public agencies, important ministries, and governmental offices, some of which are:
 Ministry of Culture and Higher Education
 Ministry of the Displaced
 Lebanese Customs
 Investment Development Authority (IDAL)
 National Economic and Social Council
 Council of Reconstruction and Development (CDR)
 Ministry of Finance
 Ministry of Transportation
 National Statistics Bureau
 Post and Telecommunications
 Ministry of State of Administrative Reform
 Public Audit Court

Beirut City Hall
Dating back to 1934, Beirut City Hall building has become an architectural landmark in the Downtown area. The building is located on the intersection of Foch Street and Rue Weygand in the city center. The building is in the Venetian and Arabesque architectural styles, a mix that expresses the regional identity of the area. The building was restored after the Lebanese Civil War and it currently houses the office of the Governor of Beirut and the municipal council. It is open to the public and for official registration of documents.

Grand Serail

Built in 1853 as an army barracks atop a hill in central Beirut, the Grand Serail currently hosts the office of the Prime Minister of Lebanon. The Grand Serail is a historic building, the most important of three Ottoman monuments on the Serail hill. The other two are the Council for Development and Reconstruction and the Hamidiyyeh clock tower. The Grand Serail followed the architectural design epitomizing the new Ottoman military organization. The building was severely damaged in the events of the Lebanese Civil War; its reconstruction took 900 work days and was completed in 1998. The Serail covers 39,700 square meters of floor space. The Grand Serail's four wings are disposed around a large courtyard which flanked at the center by a limestone and Carrera marble fountain. Both the exterior and interior facades are covered by a total of 588 arches and arcades. The two upper floors comprise the Prime Minister's residence and office, offices for his staff, as well as the cabinet room and ministers' offices. The ground floor consists of a banquet hall, two receptions areas, a press room and a courtyard. An underground level includes a car-park, offices and rooms for personnel. In all the Grand Serail includes 430 rooms and chambers in addition to the quarters for the maintenance and other service rooms.

Squares and public spaces

The Beirut Central District contains over 60 gardens, squares and open spaces. This makes the BCD home to 50% of the entire public spaces in Beirut, despite the fact that the BCD itself is only 10% of Beirut City. These public spaces gradually developed into a thriving social scene for the Beirut residents, thanks in part to the city's mild weather. City officials have imposed several plans to attract the urban users and the nature lovers to Beirut's squares and spaces. One of the plans is a "temporary uses" policy focused on a rambla pedestrian spine that links the existing city center and Beirut Souks northwards to the terraced corniche and promenade. The spine is now open for jogging and cycling, with surrounding roads being closed off to traffic on the weekends. They also include street markets and festivals, health and environment awareness campaigns, cat walks and dog shows.

National Unity Square
National Unity Square is a landscaped design garden on the southern slope of the Serail Hill. The garden was originally designed by Vladimir Djurovic in basalt stone; the project was completed in 2009 and is currently being upgraded. The garden was conceptualized in a cascading manner as to cope with the sloping nature of the area's topography. The Russian sculptor Maguerditch Mazmanian presented a statue of Lebanese Prime Minister Rafik Hariri depicting him as if walking through the garden. Elongated planes of gray stone and water mirrors, laid on a grass surface, step down towards the city. A row of Jacaranda trees marks the edge between the steps and the Grand Serail’s façade.

Khalil Gibran Garden
This popular Beirut destination was named after the famous Lebanese-American Poet Khalil Gibran. With an area of 6000 square meters, this garden was landscaped to emphasize its status as a main entrance to the city center. Its landscaped design consists of two circular lawns looking out into the garden and the UN House. Trees surround a blue water fountain and a brick-tiled platform, with six obelisks marking the gates of the garden. Several sculptures of abstract art inspired by Khalil Gibran dot the location. The space also witnessed numerous political protests in the past years adding to the venue's strategic importance. It also hosts, since 2005, a permanent sit-in tent for the demand of the release of Lebanese prisoners in Syria.

Omar Daouk Square
The Omar Daouk Square is named after the Lebanese politician Omar beik Daouk. This 1,006 square meter square was designed by Mohammad Halawi around a bust by Maguerditch Mazmanian of Omar Daouk himself. The design of the Omar Daouk Square introduces three green terraces that soften the site incline, since it lies on the inclined Omar Daouk Street. The trees and flowers surrounding it create an attractive open area where one can sit and rest.

Nejmeh Square

Nejmeh Square, or Place de l'Étoile, is the central square in the Downtown area. It is home to the Lebanese Parliament and its complementary buildings, two cathedrals, a museum, and several cafes and restaurants. Most notable for its Art Deco architecture, the square has become a recognizable icon of Beirut City worldwide.

The jewel of the square is a 1930s clock-tower with its four-faced Rolex clock. The clock tower was a gift from Lebanese-Mexican émigré Michel Abed. Today, the square is filled with tourists and locals who come here to dine, walk or enjoy the street life. The square is also known for its noticeable population of pigeons.

Waterside Park
An ambitious future project, this park will be the largest park in the city of Beirut once completed. 78,000 square meters of green space will comprise this park and help transform it into a recreational attraction for the city and its metropolitan area. It will host a public performance space, an open-air amphitheater, retail kiosks, a main entrance pavilion, and will be directly connected to the Sea Corniche. The original plans for the park included a prepared strip along its northwestern edge designed to accommodate the Formula One pits, and other temporary Formula One facilities during Grand Prix events. However, plans for the future Formula One circuit have been abandoned due to excessive demands from the Formula One Committee.

Roman Baths Garden
The "Roman Baths" is a landscaped public space that lies on the eastern slope of the Serail Hill. It consists of a garden and a set of uncovered ruins of ancient Roman baths, hence the name of the place. Originally discovered in 1968–69, the ruins underwent a thorough cleaning and further excavation in 1995–1997. Designed by the British landscaping firm Gillepsies, the Garden's layout is dominated with low-slung glass walls and lookout platforms that can be turned into concert venues, thus giving a 21st-century touch without harming the area's historical fabric.  The space contains elevated terraces that attempt to revive sights of ancient Mediterranean gardens. During the tourism season, the place hosts several open-air concerts and plays. Both tourists and locals are drawn to the popular international concerts that the place hosts as part of the World Music Day.

Sea Corniche
Once the Zaitounay Bay, the Corniche promenade, the Eastern Marina, and the Beirut Port First Basin promenade are completed, the city center will provide an uninterrupted  corniche along Beirut's shoreline. This new addition will be four times the area of the existing Corniche Beirut. The master plan for the Corniche intends to transform it into a socially active pedestrian arena with distributed "activity spots" for sports, recreation and children activities.

Castle Square Belvedere Park
Situated in the central business district of Beirut, "Castle Square Belvedere Park" is a public plaza adjacent to the oldest archaeological site in the city, the "Tell Area". The site, which includes findings that are over 6,000 years old, is the location of the ancient city of Berytus, the Roman origins of modern-day Beirut. The design of the square was conceived by the Boston-based architecture and urban design firm Machado and Silvetti in 2005. The centerpiece of the square is the "Beirut Citadel" which, although significantly reduced in size, still houses visible ruins including portions of a medieval castle and an Ottoman barrack. Water features and fountains were created on either side of the citadel to highlight the locations of both the ancient harbor and the medieval moat.

Imam Ouzai Square
The Imam Ouzai Square is part of the Beirut Souks project in the BCD. The square marks the main entrance to the souks from Rue Weygand. The square's floor is tiled with black basalt stone including an oval with outlines of the old Roman pavement, and it hosts an old olive tree in its center. Architecturally speaking, the design of the square integrates several features from its old heritage as well as several elements of modernity. A cupola-topped prayer hall to the left creates a virtual entrance to the square by mirroring a Mamluk-era shrine on the right. Some of the squares features are curved white marble planters surrounding Ibn Iraq monument, white marble circular planters with trees and shrubs; white marble circular steps guiding to Bab Idriss and the Souks upper floors; seating spaces facing the shop fronts, providing shade and emphasizing the entrance towards Souk Tawileh. The square also offers passages to Souk Sayyour and the Gold Souks.

Zeytouneh Square
Situated at the southernmost point of the Shoreline Walk, Zeytouneh Square forms a key link connecting the different sectors of the central district. Designed by Gustafson-Porter, the company of renowned American landscape architect and artist Kathryn Gustafson, the 600-sq-meters square was inaugurated in 2011, after eight years of designing, planning and construction works. Described by the square's architects as a "celebration of modern Beirut and place for cultural events", the square's terraces were made to utilize the existing slope to provide an informal amphitheater space from which concerts, festivals and films can be viewed. The surface of the Zeytouneh Square extends across the roads to the surrounding buildings, unifying the square as one large space. The bold paving patterns were inspired from the Black and White patterning found in traditional Lebanese houses, with the paving stripes changing with the topography of the landscape. Provided with free wireless internet access, the square's design was complemented with stone benches and Albizia trees, to gradually help the square become a popular hangout place.

Samir Kassir Square

A square on Rue Weygand street in the Beirut Central District commemorating the late journalist and political activist Samir Kassir. The square is located behind the An-Nahar building, the renowned newspaper headquarters where Kassir used to work. The garden boasts a bronze statue of Kassir done by the French sculptor Louis Derbré. Two historic ficus trees provide shade at the centre of the space, and a reflecting pool with water cascading over its edges marks the border with the street. The pool is flanked by a rectangular timber deck that encircles the two trees, and has at its western side a long bench of solid stone. The edges of the site have a ground cover of dwarf Natal plum (carissa macrocarpa), a water-conserving plant known for its dark evergreen leaves and its white, star-shaped flowers and red berries which grow throughout the year. In 2007, the garden won the Aga Khan Award for Architecture, an architectural prize affiliated with landscape design, area conservation, and community development and improvement.

Martyrs' Square

Synonymous with Lebanon's modern history, Martyrs' Square is a central, and biggest, town square in Beirut and its central district. Initially named "Place des Canons", or "Cannons Square", it was built by the Ottomans during their occupation of Lebanon in the 19th century. During World War I, Beirut suffered from a blockade by the Allies which was intended to starve the Turks out; however, the result was a famine that killed a quarter of Lebanon's population. An unsuccessful revolt against the Turks broke out which resulted in the execution of Lebanese nationalists in the square on 19 May 1916, hence bestowing upon it its current name, "Martyrs' Square". The Square was completely destroyed in the Lebanese Civil War, and reconstruction began in the early 1990s. The "Martyrs' Statue", the iconic bullet-riddled centerpiece of the square, was maintained and restored alongside the old opera house. After the assassination of Prime Minister Rafik Hariri, the square regained its original role as the "throbbing heart of the political life in Lebanon". The Square became ground zero for the political sit-ins, demonstrations, and protests of the Cedar Revolution in 2005. Solidere recently commissioned the re-designing and landscaping of the square, after an international urban design competition for the Martyrs' Square axis was conducted by an international organization.

Khan Antoun Bey Square
"Khan Antoun Bey Square" is an under-construction project located in the northern section of the Beirut Souks. The Portuguese landscaping studio PROAP were selected as winners of the architectural landscaping contest, and were hence commissioned by Solidere to design the square. The square's master plan addresses the site's history, location and surroundings, to develop its area as a link between the traditional city center and the newly constructed waterfront district. Once completed, the "Khan Antoun Bey Square" will be a major public plaza where pedestrian routes from the BCD converge. The square is divided into two main areas, a lower plaza and a higher circulation plaza. The transition between the two levels occurs through a pedestrian lane shaping a natural amphitheater and event seating area. Historically, this area used to be a loading dock connecting the harbor with the souqs. The square will pay tribute to this by including water features, re-installing the original harbor wall, and consolidating the remains of the ancient city wall with the square's design.

Rafik Hariri Memorial Garden
The "Rafik Hariri Memorial Garden" is a public space in the Saint George Bay neighborhood facing the InterContinental Phoenicia Beirut Hotel. The garden pays tribute to the former Lebanese Prime Minister Rafik Hariri and the other 22 victims who died in the massive car bomb attack on 14 February 2005 on the same exact site. The garden's construction was completed in two and half months's and it was inaugurated on the third anniversary of the assassination of Rafic Hariri in 2005. The memorial is a 700-square-meter replica of the garden of the Hariri family residence in Qoreitem, with water flowing from the edges of the site and a 6-meter bronze statue of the late premier on top. A bronze pole with a clock and inscriptions of verses from the Lebanese National Anthem stands near Hariri's statue, and each day at 12:55 p.m. - the time of Hariri's killing - the clock emits the sounds of church bells and the Islamic call to prayer for five minutes. In the same five minutes, a flame also rises from a 4-meter statue in the garden in the middle of five bronze Lebanese flags.

Neighborhoods

 Saint George Bay: The neighborhood along the northern shoreline of the Beirut city center. It is home to the Corniche Beirut, a marina, and the future seaside park. The St. George bay neighborhood is an important tourist district in Beirut, as it hosts several hotels and entertainment facilities like the InterContinental Phoenicia Beirut Hotel, Music Hall, Hard Rock Cafe ... etc.
 Foch-Allenby: The Foch-Allenby district is an early 20th-century European-style precinct in Downtown Beirut. The neighborhood is home to numerous old churches and mosques, and was the first office building sector in the city, dating back to the 1920s. The area is rich in business, banks, professional services, shops, fashion boutiques, department stores, art and handicrafts galleries, as well as restaurants and side-walk cafes.
 Serail Hill: The Serail Hill neighborhood is situated on an elevated portion of the Beirut Central District. It is mainly home to the Grand Serail, the Ottoman Clock Tower, the Council for Reconstruction and Development, the Conservatoire Libanais, the Roman Baths Garden, and the Rafik Hariri Sculptural Garden.
 Nejmeh Square-Rue Maarad Area: This area is most notable for its stone elevations, retained buildings, and preserved facades. This area in its current structure and form dates back to the 1930s, and was inspired by the Place de l'Étoile in Paris. The district is home to the Lebanese Parliament and its complementary buildings, several cathedrals and mosques, and a large array of side-walk cafes, restaurants, bars and clubs. All buildings are aligned along the area's radial and arcaded streets.
 Saifi Village: Located at the southeastern periphery of Downtown Beirut, Saifi Village is composed of 16 buildings organized in four clusters. This precinct is a primarily residential area and is characterized with brick-paved streets, children's playgrounds, seasonal gardens, public squares and fountains, a nursery school, and a private clinics center. Saifi is the art hub of Beirut and is vibrant with activities in its designers' and art galleries, antiques and artisan shops, delicatessen stores, decorative art and beauty specialist boutiques.
 Beirut Souks: The Souks district is a mega-shopping strip in the Beirut Central District. It is a reconstructed medieval market consisting of a complex network of alleys and pathways. The old souks were severely damaged during the Lebanese Civil War and were reconstructed by the Lebanese real estate company Solidere. The souks are home to more than 200 shops, a department store, and a handful of cafes and restaurants. The souks offer grounds regularly to concerts and open-air shows in the city center.
 Wadi Abu Jamil: Beirut's old Jewish quarter and the center of a formerly thriving Lebanese-Jewish community. The neighborhood is located on elevated grounds in the city center, gently sloping towards the Mediterranean. Largely resembling a Levantine hill town, the neighborhood is filled with clusters of stone buildings with terracotta-tiled pitched roofs and distinct Lebanese-style verandahs.

Religious buildings

The Beirut City Center is one of the most religiously diverse areas in the world. Mosques and churches lie side by side on the BCD's streets. Several of these churches and mosques are hundreds of years old and are of high archaeological significance. In total, the BCD is home to ten churches, six mosques, and one synagogue located in the Wadi Abu Jamil neighborhood. Despite the severe destruction incurred on these buildings during the Civil War, they have been restored to their prior shape and are all currently in use. During religious holidays and occasions, the churches and mosques host social gatherings, charity events, religious competitions, chorus recitals of religious verses, and mass prayers attended by Lebanon's top political figures.

Mohammad Al-Amin Mosque

The Mohammad Al-Amin Mosque is a Sunni Muslim mosque located on Beirut's Martyrs' Square. It is most known for being the backdrop of the Cedar Revolution events in 2005. Inspired by the Sultan Ahmed Mosque in Istanbul, this mosque follows the Ottoman architectural style with touches and illustrations in the Mamluk Egyptian style. It is most recognizable for its yellow ochre stone exterior, giant blue domes, and 72-meter-high Mecca-styled minarets. Construction began in 2002 by Prime Minister Rafik Hariri, and was finished in 2007. His son Saad Hariri inaugurated the mosque in a huge celebration on October 17, 2008. It is the central mosque for the Sunni Muslim denomination in Lebanon.

Grand Omari Mosque

Before being eclipsed by Mohammad Al-Amin Mosque, this initially used to be the central mosque of Beirut. Named in honor of Umar ibn al-Khattab, this mosque was initially a Crusader church, that by its turn used to be a pagan temple. Occupied and reoccupied again and again by warring factions during the Crusades era, this mosque eventually rested in the hands of the Muslims in 1291. The mosque's interior sandstone walls are decorated in Mamluk and Ottoman inscriptions. Inside the mosque, a golden steel cage, a gift from Sultan Abdul Hamid II to Beirut, encircles a shrine for John the Baptist. The mosque's Mihrab, a semicircular niche in the wall indicating the qibla, is located on the eastern side, and bears distinct ancient Greek engravings. Three hairs from prophet Muhammad were preserved in the southwestern side of the mosque; they were presented to the mosque by Sultan Abdülmecid I. The Mosque underwent several restorations by the General Directory of Awqaf and the Tourism Ministry, specifically in 1952 and 1949. It sustained severe damages in the Lebanese Civil War, and was attacked several times by militias that slashed the Sahabah names on the walls and stolen the hairs. During the reconstruction of the Beirut Central District, the mosque was renovated and enlarged to its current area.

Saint George Maronite Cathedral

The Saint George Maronite Cathedral is the cathedral of the Maronite Archdiocese in Beirut. After ten years of works started by Monsignor Joseph Debs, the construction of the cathedral was finished in 1894. The church's facade, interior and plan were inspired from the Basilica di Santa Maria Maggiore in the city of Rome. The walls of the church are decorated with stucco and marble. The armchair that Pope John Paul II used during his visit to Lebanon in May 1997 has been preserved in the cathedral's Retroquire.

St. Georges Greek Orthodox Cathedral

The Greek Orthodox Cathedral of St. Georges, completed in 1772, is located directly on Nejme Square and is the oldest orthodox church in Beirut. Its location is believed to be directly adjacent to the site of the renowned Roman Law School of Beirut. The church underwent several restorations in its history due to natural disasters, erosion, and intentional destruction. During the Lebanese Civil War, the church was burned and destroyed with most of its belongings stolen. The Greek Orthodox Archbishopric of Beirut began its renovation on October 16, 1995. The excavation at the site led to the discovery of the remains of three other churches and part of the Roman colonnades. These artifacts were incorporated into an underground museum directly located below the cathedral.

St. Nishan Armenian Orthodox Church

This is the only church dedicated for the Armenian Orthodox Church in the Beirut Central District. It is constructed directly on the Serail Hill facing the Serail and the Conservatoire Libanais. Its name means "holy sign", referring to an important relic. The church's exterior is covered with white limestone tiles, while its roof is covered with red bricks and a grey lead dome.

St. Elie Armenian Catholic Cathedral

The first Armenian Catholic cathedral to be constructed in Beirut, its construction began with the Armenian Catholic Archbishop in 1860. It was severely damaged during the civil war, due to its location directly along the Green Line. The Archbishopric took control of it in the early 1990s and began restoration works. The church was destroyed several times in history, most notably when it was torn down to be expanded in 1901 and for the construction of the Saints' Convent in 1950.

Amir Assaf Mosque
The Amir Assaf Mosque is located on Weygand Street in the central district of Beirut, near the eastern side of Al-Omari Great Mosque and facing the southeastern angle of the Municipal Palace and Samir Kassir Garden. It was built by Emir Mansour Assaf between 1572 and 1580 on the site of the Byzantine Church of the Holy Savior. It is also called "Bab Al-Saray Mosque" meaning "Door of the Great Serial". Scholars disagree regarding the reason for the mosque's second name, some say it is referring to the Ottoman Grand Serail while others insist that it's referring to "Dar Al-Wilaya", an ancient government serail near the mosque that was built by Prince Fakhr-al-Din II, governor of Beirut and Mount Lebanon.

Emir Munzer Mosque
Named after the Prince Munzer Bin Suleiman, this mosque is also called the "Nafoura" (which means Fountain) due to the presence of an ancient fountain in its courtyard. The mosque was completed in 1620 during the reign of Fakhr-al-Din II, the Prince of Mount Lebanon. The mosque contains six Roman columns in its center.

Saint Elias Greek Catholic Cathedral
The Saint Elias Cathedral is located along Nejme Square in the Beirut Central District, and is affiliated with the Greek Melkite Catholic Church in Lebanon. At the time of its completion in 1863, the cathedral was perceived as a remarkable place due to its Byzantine architecture and beautiful oriental decoration. The cathedral is famous for its notable neo-classical interior design, its marble iconostasis, the Gothic arcs, and the celestial oculi. The cathedral was restored by the archdiocese in 1994, after the damages caused by the war. The restoration works began at the end of 2003 and ended in May 2006.

National Evangelical Church

The National Evangelical Church of Beirut is the first native Arabic Protestant congregation of the Middle East. Established in downtown Beirut in 1848 by Congregational and Presbyterian American missionaries, it is the oldest and biggest of nine congregations in Lebanon. During the Lebanese Civil War (1975–1990), the church was completely destroyed, except for the bell-tower, and the congregation consequently dispersed. Since its reconstruction in 1998, the National Evangelical Church of Beirut started re-gathering its parishioners in its fold, and holding regular prayer services and organizing socio-cultural activities. Residing directly adjacent to the Grand Serail, the architecture of this church is gothic and oriental with a red-brick roof.

Saint Louis Capuchin Church

The Saint Louis Capuchin Church is a Latin Catholic church in downtown Beirut, located to the north of the Grand Serail and Council of Reconstruction and Development. Built in 1864 by the Capuchin missionaries and named it in the honor of King Louis IX of France. The church was the first landmark structure to be renovated and opened in Beirut after the end of the Lebanese Civil War. The church is highly noticeable for its sandstone facades, rose-colored wooden windows, and its new towering white-limestone campanile.

All Saints Anglican Church
All Saints church was established in 1912. The church was founded by the sea shore close to Port of Beirut in order to serve the seafarers. It became then a church for the international English speaking community in the Lebanese capital. The Arab local congregation was established by the Palestinian refugees who were forced out of their land and homes in 1948. Many Lebanese families who came back to Lebanon from Palestine, where they became Anglicans, joined the church since then. All Saints is one of 27 Anglican/Episcopal churches in the territories under the jurisdiction of the Episcopal Church in Jerusalem and the Middle East. All Saints is the only Anglican Church in Lebanon.

International and foreign institutions
The Beirut Central District has become the heart of diplomatic life in Lebanon due to the secure environment, high-tech amenities, and modern services that it enjoys. Benefiting from the geographic location of the city center and the proximity to official and business institutions, Downtown Beirut has become the center for many international institutions, business and cultural delegations, and foreign embassies. As such, several countries have become officially represented in the city center through embassies, business and cultural cooperation agencies, humanitarian NGOs, and consulates. Some of these are:

 American-Lebanese Chamber of Commerce
 World youth alliance 
 Union of Arab Banks
 ESCWA
 Embassy of Belgium
 Embassy of Italy
 Consulate of Belize
 Instituto Cervantes
 Arab Cultural Foundation
 Lebanese-German Business Council
 Amideast Cultural Cooperation agency
 Consulate of Turkey
 Embassy of Japan
 Embassy of Britain
 Embassy of Argentina
 Consulate of Gambia
 Embassy of Australia
 Embassy of Norway
 Embassy of Denmark

UN House
A landmark development at the southern gateway to the city center, overlooking Riad Al Solh Square and Gibran Khalil Gibran monumental garden, UN House was designed by Pierre El Khoury Architects as an intelligent building to house several United Nations local and regional agencies. Since its inauguration by UN Secretary General Kofi Annan in 1997, the UN House has become the focal point of the diplomatic activity in Lebanon. Best known for being the headquarters of the UN Economic and Social Commission for Western Asia (ESCWA), UN House also hosts several UN regional and local headquarters including the World Bank's permanent Beirut office. The architecture of this nine-story development is in the shape of an arch, with an internal landscaped atrium of 600 sq m providing a pleasant shaded area with trees, flowers and benches. Extensive use of glass in the external walls gives the building a glittering appearance and allows natural light throughout. It is an intelligent building equipped with state-of-the-art technology. It comprises 43,000 square meters of floor space including offices, a library, language lab facilities, a conference center, storage, parking and retail space. The UN House hosts important conferences throughout the year.

Shopping and dining

The city center houses more than 350 retail outlets distributed along its streets and quarters. Shopping in the city center mainly consists of upscale fashion boutique chains, world-renowned designer shops, high-end stores, and luxury boutiques boasting the most expensive designer labels. Stores sell fashion clothing, accessories, jewelry, furniture, Hi-Fi and electronic equipment, records and books, handicrafts and gifts, art and antiques. The stores are mostly at street level, but recently some have expanded onto upper floors. Buildings or group of buildings are dedicated to department stores. Starting from the conservation area, stores are spreading to other areas to finally culminate in the Beirut Souks.

There are over 100 cafes, restaurants, pubs and nightclubs open in the Beirut Central District. Restaurants offer a variety of French, Italian, American, Lebanese, Chinese, Japanese and other Asian cuisines. Sidewalk cafes are a trademark of the Downtown area, with tens of them lining the streets. They range from oriental cafes serving Turkish coffee and Shisha to global franchises such as Starbucks.

Beirut Souks

The Beirut Souks is a mega-shopping district in Downtown Beirut. It is home to more than 200 shops and a department store, thus making it Beirut's biggest shopping strip. The souks project is a reconstruction of the old medieval market, after it sustained irreparable damage from the Lebanese Civil War. In 1994, the Lebanese Parliament approved a master plan conceived by Lebanese architect Jad Tabet, and construction was taken on by the real estate company Solidere. Solidere sought to bring back the souks' historic commercial function at the heart of Beirut and appeal to the mercantile community that had fled during the war, while still preserving  the original Hellenistic street grid that characterized the old souks and the area's historical landmarks. The souks were designed as interconnected open spaces with many access points along long vaulted shopping alleys and arcades. The Beirut Souks have retained their historical names: Souk al Tawila (the long souk), Souk Arwam, Souk Jamil, Souk Ayyass, Souk Sayyour, Souk Bustros and Souk Arwad. Some of the stores in the souks are Cartier, Gucci, Burberry, Fendi, Zara, Mark Jacobs, Dolce & Gabbana, Dior, Massimo Dutti, Mango, Bottega Veneta, Timberland, Yves Saint Laurent, Bershka, Roberto Cavalli, Springfield, Chloe, Jimmy Choo, Jack & Jones, Stella McCartney, Celine, Louis Vuitton, Vero Moda, and Pull and Bear.

The northern section of Beirut Souks houses an entertainment complex designed by Paris-based architecture firm Valode & Pistre. A mega entertainment destination, it comprises 14 cinemas with two VIP halls served by large lounge and concession areas. At Allenby Street Level, high-end boutiques line the sides while the adjacent L-shaped building hosts the cafes and restaurants. The northern souks also have a large department store designed by the international architecture and design firm Zaha Hadid Architects, based in Clerkenwell, London.

Art and music

Beirut is the center of the entertainment business and art scene in the region. A thriving artistic center, Beirut has become a new regional hub for exhibitions, art galleries, and music performances. Local, regional and international exhibitions are regularly organized around the quarters of the city center. Those exhibitions cover a varied array of topics spanning sculptures, paintings, architecture and urban planning, manuscripts and archives, photography, handicrafts, and various other technical, commercial, industrial, and scientific themes. Venues that host these exhibitions range from historic buildings, cultural centers, media headquarters, bookstores and cafes to wholly dedicated exhibition centers and specialized display galleries. Also, open spaces often host numerous temporary art galleries and public shows. Beirut Souks, specifically Ajami Square and Trablous Street, have become a favorable location for street shows, exhibitions and concerts like the 2011 Miss Lebanon Pageant. Beirut International Exhibition & Leisure Center (commonly BIEL) is a dedicated fair ground, constituting 15000 sq meters of display floor, that hosts diversely themed exhibitions. Saifi Village is Beirut's "Quartier des Arts" or "Arts Quarter", hosting year-round events in its vibrant cluster of art galleries and artisan shops. Concerts and musical performances can be attended in churches or historic buildings, in open spaces, and in private venues like the Music Hall.

Beirut Central District gradually regained, as well as evolved, its role as the cultural and literature pivot of the capital. Major bookstores and libraries in the country are located here, and constantly host book signings, book launching, seminars and conferences by world-renowned, regional and local authors. Major bookstores are Librarie Antoune, Al Bourj Bookstore, Virgin Megastores, and Sored bookstore; as well as a planned public library on Martyrs' Square. The central district is also home to the headquarters of the acclaimed Pan-Middle East newspapers An-Nahar, The Daily Star, and L'Orient-Le Jour. In 2010, Beirut was named the World Book Capital, celebrations and activities of the occasion were held in the BIEL center in the central district. The central district is home to the annual Beirut Arab & International Book Fair, that features works and authors from Lebanon, Saudi Arabia, Kuwait, United Arab Emirates, Oman, Iraq, Palestine and Egypt and several others, with some 180 Lebanese publishers, and dozens more from the rest of the Arab world participating. Another major Book Fair held in the central district is the Francophone Book Fair. The fair gathers together authors and personalities from Europe, North Africa and Lebanon, with a different country being chosen as the guest of honor each year. In its twienth year, the fair welcomed nearly 100,000 visitors. In 2012, The Arab and International Book Fair entered its 56th year, while the Francophone Book Fair turned twenty.

During the summer season, the new waterfront in the Beirut Central District becomes a gigantic concert arena that hosts world-class performers and shows. The list of performers at the new waterfront district includes David Guetta, Shakira, Thirty Seconds to Mars, Flo Rida, James Blunt, Marcel Khalife, Kesha, Alexandra Stan, Sean Kingston, T-Pain, Warda Al-Jazairia, Akon, Lil Wayne, Sting, Mariah Carey, Phil Collins, 50 Cent, Majida El Roumi, Ricky Martin, Mika, Tiësto, The Pussycat Dolls, Snoop Dogg, Michael Bolton, Armin Van Buuren, Enrique Iglesias, Red Hot Chili Peppers, Fairuz, Evanescence, Taio Cruz, Scorpions ... etc.

Beirut Music and Art Festival
2011 witnessed the launching of the Beirut Music and Art Festival, an annual event to take place at Beirut Souks. The organizers of the event described it as "a vision that looks to fulfill Beirut’s role as cultural capital of the Middle East". The aim for this festival is to promote and strengthen the cultural scene in Lebanon and the Middle East, by proposing a combination of local musicians, world-class performers and art in all its forms. The artists' and singers' performances were divided along two stages: The Grand Stand venue and The Music village venue. The list of performers in the festival's first year included Al Di Meola, Earth, Wind & Fire, Goran Bregovic, Ilham al-Madfai, Marcel Khalife, Natacha Atlas, Roger Hodgson and many more.

Beirut Jazz Festival
The Beirut Jazz Festival is an annual music festival and celebration that runs for almost ten days each year. The festival was launched in 2007 in downtown Beirut by Solidere, the real estate company behind the re-development of the Beirut Central District. The festival has taken place in different venues each year, most recently on Ajami Square in the Beirut Souks. According to the festival's organizers, the Beirut Jazz Festival doesn't limit itself exclusively to classical Jazz music but "integrates folkloric Arabic Music into western improvisational musical ideas whilst experimenting with traditional music genres from diverse parts of the world".
Some of the jazz artists who have taken part in the festival recently are Rabih Abou-Khalil, Charbel Rouhana, Marcus Miller, Patti Austin, Randy Crawford, Joe Sample, Arturo Sandoval, Charlie Winston, Chucho Valdés and several others.

Fête de la Musique

Initiated in Paris in 1982, The Fête de la Musique, or World Music Day, has evolved into an international music festival that is celebrated worldwide, and in the Middle East only Jordan, Morocco, and Algeria celebrate it next to Lebanon. It is an all-night music celebration held at the moment of the summer solstice, and consists of free concerts by amateur and professional musicians and are accessible to all the public. It takes place in various venues in the Beirut Central District (mainly Martyrs' Square, Roman Baths Garden, and Samir Kassir Square) or outside of the district (Rue Hamra and Rue Gouraud). "Time Out Beirut" magazine described the festival saying that "it encourages people to see great free music and break down the barriers between the streets and the players, it’s a democratising evening of musical discovery".

Beirut Celebrates
"Beirut Celebrates" is the name of the annual Christmas and New Year's Eve festivities in the Beirut Central District. Under the patronage of the Prime Minister of Lebanon and the Lebanese Ministry of Culture, Solidere, the Lebanese Company for the Development and Reconstruction of Beirut, organizes a  series of events on the occasion of the end of the year festivities. The downtown area witnesses a giant Christmas Parade that straddles along Martyrs' Square, Allenby Street, and Beirut Souks; and the inauguration of the " Santa's Village", a Christmas market in Saifi Village. Other celebrations include Christmas Lights, Lighting of the Christmas tree, Firework shows, singing carols, marching bands, Santa floats, and many more events.

Beirut International Marathon

"Beirut International Marathon" is an annual event in the Beirut Central District that started on October 19, 2003. It is organized by the non-profit NGO "Beirut Marathon Association" whose mission, according to their website, is to "passionately organize running events that inspire unity, positively change lifestyles, promote wellness, and provide an experience of challenge, achievement, joy, and glory; for the benefit of Lebanon, both for now and generations to come". Since it launched its first race in 2003, the marathon has grown noticeably receiving local and international recognition; thus earning the Bronze Road Race Label from the International Association of Athletics Federations, the "Power of Sports" award from the AIPSF, and the Laureus World Sports Awards. The marathon's trail starts at a different point in the Beirut Central District each year but always terminates at Martyrs' Square. The marathon constitutes eight races: the 42 kilometer race, the 42 kilometer race (wheelchair), 42 kilometer relay, the 10 kilometer fun run, the 10,000 meters run, the 10,000 meters run (wheelchair), the 5 kilometer youth run, the one kilometer "run with mom" race. In 2009, the Beirut Marathon nearly drew 33,000 runners covering various distances from 10 kilometers to the traditional 42 kilometers.

"Beirut Chants" Festival
Beirut Chants is a sacred music festival launched in 2007 by Solidere, and is part of the European Festivals Association. It takes place over a period of five weeks each year-end in the historical churches of the central district. It includes recitative, sacred choral music, chamber and philharmonic orchestra performances, and a wide variety vocal and instrumental music shows. Some of the notable performers are La Scala Orchestra, Notre Dame University Choir, Lebanese National Symphony Orchestra, Abeer Nehme, Jeff Cohen, Abdel Rahman El Bacha, Vadym Kholodenko, among many others. Mounir Douaidy, General Manager of Solidere, described his company's sponsorship of the festival as "supporting and endorsing all arts and culture activities in Beirut Central District aiming to revive Beirut’s role as a key multicultural hub in the Middle East." The festival's fifth edition in 2012 attracted large crowds counting more than 20,000 persons from all over Lebanon.

New Waterfront District

A good portion of the Beirut Central District lies on land reclaimed from the Mediterranean,  providing an uninterrupted 3.5-km extension of the city shoreline. The Waterfront District is a prime, active, multi-use district with financial, business, residential, tourist and leisure facilities and extensive green areas and bold architecture, that overlooks the Saint George Bay and Mount Lebanon. When fully completed, it will contain two marinas, a waterside city park, Corniche and quayside promenades, with 29 ha of new waterside development land. The entire district comprises 73 hectares of reclaimed land north of the old seashore, enclosed within a terraced sea defense system designed to withstand centennial storms. Together with the Seaside Park, Corniche Beirut and the West Marina with land, quays and breakwater around, it includes development blocks and public domain extending north of Beirut Souks area to reach the corniche promenade, and east of the Seaside Park to reach the first basin of the Port of Beirut and the planned East Marina. The Seaside Park was recently the subject of a design competition among six international landscape architectural firms.

Solidere's phasing strategy includes dedicating a carefully planned zone for temporary uses while allowing perimeter development to take place. The strategy spatially focuses on a pedestrian spine that links the existing city center and Beirut Souks to the terraced waterfront corniche promenades. The spine is open for walking, jogging, cycling, kiting and other similar activities. Solidere created cultural, recreational and commercial attractions via constructing structures and open spaces with a wide-ranging program of activities, such as the Beirut Exhibition Center. Other temporary structures in the New Waterfront are a sports center, a beach club, a winter sky bar, and many restaurants and cafes. An area in the eastern part of the district was leased to Beirut International Exhibition & Leisure Center (BIEL); it includes exhibition halls, conference areas, a banquet pavilion and a seaside restaurant.

The marine works on the Waterfront District includes a submerged reef as first defense line extending 100 m seawards along the full extent of the Corniche - 80 reinforced concrete caissons, each 17.5 m wide, 27.75 m long and 10.5 m high, as second defense line. The superstructure provides two-level promenades over 1.3 km. Back-filling behind them provides a stabilizing bond and a third promenade, 5.5 m above sea level. 
On September 16, 2012, the New Waterfront District was the site of a huge mass held by the pope. The mass was the culmination of Pope Benedict XVI's three-day visit to Lebanon. An estimated 350,000 people gathered on the waterfront for the event.

West Marina

Beirut Central District has two marinas, to the west and east of the new Waterfront district. Beirut West Marina is to the west of the central district, within short walking distance of the Beirut Souks, BIEL and historic core. West Marina provides mooring for 164 boats on average annually, having been opened in 2001. Its capacity stands at 186 boats, ranging from 5 to 65 meters, with three-quarters of the mooring area accommodating boats of more than 25 meters long. Solidere developed and is operating the West Marina as part of its 50-year agreement with the Lebanese Government, which also includes planned underground corniche car park. Construction on the East Marina will commence in early 2013 in the northeast quarter of the Waterfront District.

Beirut Exhibition Center
Beirut Exhibition Center is the first structure dedicated to contemporary art in Beirut's new waterfront district. It is composed of 1200 square meters of art gallery space, with its exterior shell covered in reflective mirror-like steel. Working with the topography, the building sits in a reflective pool of water that further reflects both the building and its surroundings, including a bamboo grove to the north and a sculpture garden to the south. The center is designed by L.E.FT, an architecture and landscape design firm based in New York City. L.E.FT described the center saying: "The mirror facades allow the Beirut Exhibition Center to act as a scale reflecting the continuously changing landscape in the waterfront district. The city becomes a work of art, an abstract expressionist painting in motion. Beirut finally sees itself in the mirror." An adjacent landscape garden and an outdoor cafe are annexed to the Beirut Exhibition Center.

Zaitunay Bay

Zaitunay Bay is a quayside commercial and tourist strip around the West Marina, composed of 17 restaurants and cafes, 5 retail stores, 2 activity centers, a yachtclub and a boardwalk. The quayside restaurant strip is a prime destination in the city center with restaurants stretching along the Beirut Marina, from the site's western limit to the Yacht Club building on the east. The strip houses several international restaurant and cafe chains such as Paul, Moti Mahal Delux, Häagen-Dazs, and The Coffee Bean & Tea Leaf, aside to many local outlets serving seafood, and Lebanese or French Cuisine.

Zaitunay Bay is a joint venture between Solidere and Stow, and is designed by American architect Steven Holl, famous for projects such as the Simmons Hall at MIT and the Linked Hybrid complex in Beijing. The project is conceived as an urban beach, extending the existing Corniche Beirut and the new sea promenade in a series of overlapping platforms, reminiscent of sea waves, provide extensive outdoor spaces. These open public spaces in the Bay host cultural events, concerts, art exhibitions and a variety of seasonal celebrations. The one-floor construction remains below street level, with the roofs forming a continuation of the Corniche Beirut. The landscape design for the entry plaza, quayside and corniche sidewalk, create open-air terraces in the form of a ‘stone beach’ over the restaurants and shops. Zaitunay Bay is accessible to the general public with the promenade on the upper level linking the public sidewalk to the marina boardwalk in a vehicle-free environment accessible through 7 pedestrian access points with adjacent underground public parking facilities. The Yacht Club accommodates three basement levels; exclusive commercial shops at marina level; a yacht club and 53 state-of-the-art furnished and serviced apartments on the upper three levels, with one, two and three bedrooms. Two activity centers provide all sea-related services and water sports activities such as rentals for boats, yachts and jet-skis, fishing and scuba diving trips, boat rides, and water-skiing and para-sailing lessons. "Zaitunay", literally meaning olives, is the old name of the area in the pre-Lebanese Civil War era.

Beirut International Exhibition & Leisure Center

The Beirut International Exhibition & Leisure Center (BIEL) is a mixed-use center consisting of 82,000 square meters of multi-functional areas: 10,000 square meters of which is indoor column-free exhibition space, 25,000 square meters of outdoor exhibition space, a state-of-the-art conference center, a grand Ballroom and ample parking. BIEL hosts and caters for a wide array of events like professional trade exhibitions, public consumer shows, concerts, conferences, congresses and seminars, weddings and Gala dinners. The center also accommodates several music concerts with its capacity of 9,000 seated persons or 20,000 standing persons. The center is also equipped with 42000 square meters car parking capacity with Heavy Vehicle access. Pavilion Royal, adjacent to the main BIEL building; is a 2000 m2 hall with an 8 m high ceiling and a 56m-glass Mediterranean-facing facade that can accommodate up to 1500-seated guests for weddings, gala dinners, cocktail receptions, corporate launchings, conferences and other events.  BIEL also features 1200 square meters of underground multi-purpose conference halls: grand hall with a 9000 persons capacity, and two conference rooms with a 700 persons capacity each.

Beirut Fitness Center
The Beirut Fitness Center is developed by Solidere on a designated stretch within the New Waterfront District for temporary programs that are expected to operate for a period of 8–10 years. The aim behind the center is to establish activities that will generate new public destinations that connect to the planned central pedestrian spine, up to Beirut Souks and Rue Weygand. The center covers 8700 m2 serving up to 2000 members. A landscaped park is underway at a new reference level, 6 meters lower than the street level. Unlike conventional urban sports facilities and gyms, which are typically closed and contained within buildings, Beirut Fitness Center relies on its connection and exposure to outdoor spaces. The project develops around a 1260 m2 outdoor courtyard and 2 outdoor tennis courts of 1222 m2 located at the new reference level. Indoor activity spaces including fitness and aquatic zones, squash courts, reading rooms, and multipurpose spaces lie along the periphery of the outdoor courtyard and tennis courts separated only by clear glazed full-height operable panels. At this level, services including showers, lockers, treatment rooms and technical areas are inserted in a long narrow band along the north–south axis on the western side of the plot. The street level ground is highlighted by 5690 m2 of red epoxy finished concrete floor extending on the totality of the surface defining the open and permeable boundaries of the center, specifically in connection to the pedestrian spine on the eastern edge. There is no built mass on the ground level, only transparent planes 2.2 meters high that frame the courtyard and tennis courts below, allowing the public to overlook sports and related activities through the vertical open-air transparent facades. The automobiles’ elliptical track and parking spots around the courts and the open voids frame the project's activities. The entrance and drop-off to the fitness center are accessed from the western side of the site and highlighted with a 40 m long portico.

References

External links

 
 https://web.archive.org/web/20150213224944/http://www.solidere.com/solidere.html
 https://web.archive.org/web/20180105023903/http://www.downtownbeirut.com/

Neighbourhoods of Beirut
Central business districts
Financial districts
Redeveloped ports and waterfronts
Land reclamation
Populated waterside places
Shopping districts and streets in Lebanon
Tourist attractions in Beirut